East Walton is a village in the English county of Norfolk. East Walton constitutes part of the civil parish of West Acre.

History
East Walton's name is of Anglo-Saxon origin and derives from the Old English for 'wall farm settlement.'

East Walton has seen numerous archaeological digs which have discovered the site of a possible Bronze Age burial barrow and three separate Roman settlements.

In the Domesday Book, East Walton is listed as a settlement of 37 households in the hundred of Freebridge. In 1086, the village was divided between the East Anglian estates of Alan of Brittany, Roger Bigod and Ralph de Tosny.

East Walton was the site of significant Second World War defences in preparation for a German invasion, defences including a pillbox and searchlight were installed in the east of the village with a further tank trap built on the bridge over the River Nar. In August 1942, a Dornier 217 shot down by a Bristol Beaufighter flown by Ft-Off. Hugh Wyrill crashed in nearby Walton Wood.

Geography

East Walton falls within the constituency of South West Norfolk and is represented at Parliament by Liz Truss MP of the Conservative Party. For the purposes of Local Government, East Walton falls within the district of King's Lynn and West Norfolk.

St. Mary's Church
East Walton's church is dedicated to Saint Mary and is one of Norfolk's 124 remaining Anglo-Saxon round tower churches. Though the tower pre-dates the Norman Conquest, the rest of the church building dates from the Fourteenth Century, with the interior being significantly remodelled in the early-Eighteenth Century.

Notes

External links

Village website
St Mary's on the European Round Tower Churches Website
The web site for St Mary's Church, East Walton

King's Lynn and West Norfolk
Villages in Norfolk
Civil parishes in Norfolk